Joliet is a town in Carbon County, Montana, United States. It is part of the Billings, Montana Metropolitan Statistical Area. The population was 577 at the 2020 census.

History
The construction of the Rocky Fork & Cooke City Railway in 1892 made Joliet a shipping point. The Joliet Post Office was established on June 10, 1893, with Maud Smith as its first postmaster. The town was named for Joliet, Illinois.

The Fire Hall is listed on the NRHP.

Geography
Joliet is located at  (45.484520, −108.971257). U.S. Route 212 cuts through town. Rock Creek flows to the south.

Climate

According to the Köppen Climate Classification system, Joliet has a warm-summer humid continental climate, abbreviated "Dfb" on climate maps.

Demographics

2010 census
As of the census of 2010, there were 595 people, 260 households, and 165 families residing in the town. The racial makeup of the town was 97.3% White, 0.3% African American, 0.8% Native American, 0.2% Asian, 0.7% from other races, and 0.7% from two or more races. Hispanic or Latino of any race were 1.8% of the population.

There were 260 households, of which 28.8% had children under the age of 18 living with them, 48.1% were married couples living together, 11.9% had a female householder with no husband present, 3.5% had a male householder with no wife present, and 36.5% were non-families. 32.3% of all households were made up of individuals, and 19.2% had someone living alone who was 65 years of age or older. The average household size was 2.29 and the average family size was 2.91.

The median age in the town was 41.1 years. 24.9% of residents were under the age of 18; 5.9% were between the ages of 18 and 24; 22.7% were from 25 to 44; 27% were from 45 to 64; and 19.7% were 65 years of age or older. The gender makeup of the town was 50.4% male and 49.6% female.

Education
Joliet Public Schools educates students from Kindergarten through 12th grade. They are known as the J-Hawks. Joliet High School is a Class B school (108 - 306 students) which helps determine athletic competitions.

Joliet Public Library serves the area.

Notable people
 Billy Hograth, former member of the Montana State Senate and candidate for Governor of Montana
 Jack Waddell, test pilot on the maiden flight of the Boeing 747

References

Billings metropolitan area
Towns in Carbon County, Montana